The Central Federal District is one of the eight federal districts of Russia. Geographically, the district is situated in the extreme west of present-day Russia; although it can be considered as the central region of European Russia. The Presidential Envoy to the Central Federal District is Igor Shchyogolev.

Demographics

Federal subjects
The district comprises the Central and Central Black Earth economic regions and eighteen federal subjects:

Ethnic groups
Ethnic composition, according to the 2010 census: Total - 38 427 539 people.

Russians - 34 240 603 (89.10%)

Ukrainians - 514 919 (1.34%)

Armenians - 270,996 (0.71%)

Tatars - 265 913 (0.69%)

Azerbaijanis - 132 312 (0.34%)

Belarusians - 128 742 (0.34%)

Uzbeks - 90 652 (0.24%)

Jews - 69,409 (0.18%)

Moldovans - 65 645 (0.17%)

Georgians - 63 612 (0.17%)

Tajiks - 62,785 (0.16%)

Mordva - 51 826 (0.13%)

Roma - 49,535 (0.13%)

Chuvash - 40,157 (0.10%)

Kyrgyz - 29,269 (0.08%)

Chechens - 25,734 (0.07%)

Germans - 25,219 (0.07%)

Koreans - 21,779 (0.06%)

Ossetians - 19,203 (0.05%)

Lezgins - 17 843 (0.05%)

Kazakhs - 17,608 (0.05%)

Turks - 15 322 (0.04%)

Bashkirs - 15,249 (0.04%)

Yezidis - 13 727 (0.04%)

Avars - 12,887 (0.03%)

Dargins - 10,095 (0.03%)

Persons who did not indicate nationality - 1,944,531 people.  (5.06%)

Persons of other nationalities - 2,260,631 people.  (5.88%)

Economy 

, the GRP in Central Federal District reached RUB33.6 trillion(€407 billion) and around €10,000 per capita.

References

External links

Official site: Federal Cadaster Center of Russia 

 
Federal districts of Russia
States and territories established in 2000
2000 establishments in Russia